Giovanni Gil, also known as Hector Giovanni Gil Portillo (San Salvador, December 19, 1971) is a plastic artist and one of the greatest exhibitors of Engraving in El Salvador. He is the founder and director of the projects Soñar al Revés [Dreaming Backwards] and Bajo Presión [Under Pressure]  and is the winner of the Silver Medal at the Salon of Contemporary Art El Salvador-

Japón.

Academic and Professional Trajectory 
He began his art studies in 1991 at the National Center of Arts [Centro Nacional de Artes, CENAR], with the Baccalaureate in Arts where he develops his skills in the schools of Theater, Music, Dance, and Visual Arts. It is the latter that captivates him, he specializes in the branch of Engraving at the request of Master Carlos Cañas, who served at that time as director of the CENAR. He completed his studies in 1993 and is hired as a professor in 1994 in this same institution, when he decides to pursue his university studies at the Salvadoran Lutheran University [Universidad Luterana Salvadoreña] where he graduated with a degree in Education Administration.

In 1997 he was promoted to Head of the Engraving Workshop at CENAR and in 1999 he made a study trip to Japan, where he visited art schools, galleries and museums. In 2001 he returns to travel for study to Cuba.

He also holds the position of Director and Coordinator of Visual Arts at CENAR in 2017.

Family 
Giovanni Gil was born in an entrepreneurial family, his parents are Marina Portillo and Luis Felipe Gil and has two brothers.

Soñar al Revés [Dreaming Backwards] 
The artist Giovanni Gil creates social initiative Soñar al Revés in 2003 in order to raise awareness, inform and bring the Salvadoran population closer with engraving, the arts in general and also to change the vision of Salvadorans to dream upside down with their reality, in other words that they aspire to make a change in their reality by taking the first step, which is according to the artist, dreaming. Its name is born of the technique of the engraving where everything that is drawn must be think the opposite way so that the impression is to the right. This initiative has exhibitions such as:

Bajo Presión [Under Pressure] 

“The project aims to generate a participation among established, emerging and initiated (students) artists in the practice of engraving, with the purpose of transferring knowledge” - Giovanni Gil.This is how Giovanni Gil defines the project of which he is founder and director. Bajo Presión [Under Pressure] was born with a primary objective, which is to join the guild of artists in El Salvador, And not only to seek unity among them, but to retake the technique that was and has been practiced by great exhibitors of plastic art in history. Its name comes from the process of creating an engraving where pressure is exerted on two surfaces and an image is obtained, however it is also born, as described by one of the participants Juan Glower, by the group pressure that is generated where the opinions of all counts and one has to strip himself of his individuality to form part of a whole; among the techniques that this artist has encouraged to learn or develop in greater depth are Etching, Aquatint and Drypoint.“[...] The democratization of the visual arts is sought, both in visual consumption and material” - Giovanni Gil.

This particular project brought together, in its first edition in 2013, 22 Salvadoran artists and students of engraving  and was dedicated to the person who inspired Giovanni to undertake the arts, Carlos Cañas. .

Bajo Presión 2014, reunited 32 artists and students, this is when the Secretary of Culture appointed the month of February 2014 as the Engraving month in El Salvador. In Bajo Presión 2015, 36 artists met, among them students, as on previous occasions, in order to support talented young Salvadorans to forge their careers in art.

In 2016 the activity is carried out for the fourth consecutive year and the number of participants grows, being 44 artists and students, the technique that was worked on that occasion was Chalcography and Drypoint and the engravings were mostly illuminated . At the same time Silvia Elena Regalado, Secretary of Culture, re-denominates February as Engraving month in the context of the inauguration of Bajo Presión 2016 . Another important aspect that all the editions of Bajo Presión have is that the collection of engravings after its official presentation travel and are exhibited throughout El Salvador to bring art to the public.

Awards 
Giovanni Gil is awarded of many honors including before starting his career, here is the list of awards obtained:
 Second Place in Drawing, in the contest for educational institutions of Ministry of Education in 1984.
 Third Place in the art contest Palmares Diplomat, with an engraving in 2000.
 Honorific Mention in the Primera Bienal de Arte Paiz in 2001.
 Honorific Mention in Arte Joven of Centro Cultural de España, in 2002.
 Silver Medal in the Salon of Contemporary Art El Salvador-Japan in 2008.
 Honorific Mention at the art aution SUMARTE of the Art Museum MARTE in 2010.
Recognitions:
 Public Recognition of Intellectual Property in the Discipline of Visual Arts: Engraving and Painting, by the National Center of Records (CNR) in 2003.

Artwork 
"Giovanni Gil Is an excellent engraver worker in his various manifestations. His work provides us a link with his creativity, so that we are able to attend, visit and penetrate the grace of the line as depositary of the form. It expresses so sharply the strength and the delicacy. All of his product is therefore part of his sensitivity. To see his engraving, it is therefore to see his creativity."This is how Carlos Cañas described the line, style and work of Giovanni, who although his specialty is engraving also develops other areas of the visual arts and his style is more focused with contemporary art. Has performed more than 80 individual and collective exhibitions  And his work is found in different private collections in countries such as Japan, Denmark, Colombia, the United States, Chile, Brazil, Guatemala, Cuba, Puerto Rico, Spain, France, Tunisia, El Salvador, Canada, South Africa, Portugal, among others.

In addition to the plastic art, Gil has written a manifesto called "Maldita Herencia" in which it explains a little of the art history, engraving and support to artists in El Salvador. He has also served as reference in other publications as ''Procesos de Arte en El Salvador". And belongs to the Asociación de Artistas Plásticos de El Salvador.

External links 

 Official Website - www.giovannigil.com
 Pinterest - https://www.pinterest.com/giovannigilsv/
 Instagram - http://instagram.com/giovannigilprint
 Facebook - https://www.facebook.com/giovannigilsv

References 

Watercolorists
Salvadoran artists
21st-century engravers
Lithographers
1971 births
Living people
University of El Salvador alumni
People from San Salvador